Sulfinalol is a beta adrenergic receptor antagonist.

Synthesis
The methyl group on a sulfoxide is sufficiently acidic to substitute for phenolic hydroxyl. 

The preparation of this combined α- and β-blocker sulfinalol begins by protection of the phenolic hydroxyl as its benzoate ester. Bromination followed by condensation with 4-(4-methoxyphenyl)butan-2-amine (not PMA) gives the aminoketone 3. Successive catalytic reduction and saponification affords aminoalcohol 4. Oxidation of the sulfide to the sulfoxide with a reagent such as metaperiodate gives sulfinalol (5).

References

Beta blockers
Sulfoxides
Phenols